Icta is a genus of moths.

ICTA may refer to:
Imperial College of Tropical Agriculture, a college in Trinidad, now the St Augustine Campus of the University of the West Indies
Income and Corporation Taxes Act 1988, a United Kingdom act of Parliament
Independent Television Companies Association, a former organisation in the United Kingdom
Information and Communication Technology Agency of Sri Lanka
Information and Communication Technologies Authority (Mauritius)
Information and Communication Technologies Authority (Turkey)
Information and Communication Technology Authority (Cayman Islands)
Information and Communication Technology Authority (Kenya)
Integrated Circuit Topography Act, a Canadian intellectual property statute
International Center for Technology Assessment

See also 
 Iqta', a mediaeval tax practice